The Provisional Government of Lithuania was a temporary government aiming for independent Lithuania during the last days of the first Soviet occupation and the first months of German Nazi occupation in 1941. 

It was secretly formed on 22 April 1941, announced on 23 June 1941, and dissolved on 5 August 1941. It was formed from the members of the Lithuanian Activist Front (LAF) in Kaunas and Vilnius.

History

The provisional government was confirmed on 22 June 1941 at the start of the June Uprising. However, the leader of the LAF, Kazys Škirpa, who was supposed to become the prime minister, was in Berlin at the time, hoping to obtain recognition for Lithuania (he was also former Lithuanian envoy to Germany and therefore continued to reside there). Since the Nazi regime saw Lithuania as a future part of Greater Germany, it was not much interested in Lithuanian independence, but allowed the Provisional Government to operate while it was useful. Kazys Škirpa was not allowed to leave Germany; instead, he was put under house arrest. Rapolas Skipitis, another minister-to-be who also was in Berlin at the time was prevented from leaving as well.

Vytautas Bulvičius, who was intended to become Minister of Defence, was arrested by the Soviet forces on 2 June. His place was therefore taken by General Stasys Raštikis. On 21 June 1941 (just one day before Germany declared war on the Soviet Union), four members of the planned government were arrested by the Soviets: Vladas Nasevičius, Vytautas Statkus, and Jonas Vainauskas. They were imprisoned in Gorky (now Nizhny Novgorod). The tribunal started on 26 November 1941 (after the uprising had ended, and while Lithuania was still occupied by Germany). Sentences were pronounced on 28 November: Bulvičius was executed, while Masiliūnas, Nasevičius, and Statkus were exiled to Siberia, along with other people arrested at the same time.

Literary historian Juozas Ambrazevičius-Brazaitis became acting prime minister instead of Škirpa.

The Provisional Government did little to stop the anti-Jewish violence encouraged by the Nazis and the anti-Semitic leadership of the Lithuanian Activist Front. Lithuanian police battalions formed by the Provisional Government helped the Nazis carry out the Holocaust.

The Provisional Government dissolved itself in August 1941 after failing to achieve its goal of an autonomous if not independent Lithuania under German patronage.

Cabinet
The people who were meant to be in the government:
Prime Minister: Colonel Kazys Škirpa (was prevented from assuming the position and placed under house arrest in Berlin)
Education/Acting Prime Minister: Juozas Ambrazevičius-Brazaitis
Defense: Major Vytautas Bulvičius (arrested by Russians on 2 June, executed in November), later General Stasys Raštikis
Foreign affairs: Rapolas Skipitis (was not able to leave Berlin)
Internal affairs: Vladas Nasevičius (arrested by Soviets on 21 June, later exiled to Siberia)
Finance: 
Health Ksaveras Vencius
Trade: Vytautas Statkus (arrested by Soviets on 21 June, later exiled to Siberia)
Industry: Doctor engineer 
Agriculture: Professor 
Social security: Doctor 
Infrastructure: Engineer Vytautas Landsbergis-Žemkalnis
Communication:  (arrested by Soviets on 21 June, later exiled to Siberia)
Controller of state: Jonas Vainauskas (arrested by Soviets on 21 June)

See also
 Lithuanian Activist Front
 Lithuanian TDA Battalions
 Lithuanian collaboration during World War II
 Reichskommissariat Ostland
 Lithuanian Soviet Socialist Republic

References

Lithuanian collaboration with Nazi Germany
Eastern European World War II resistance movements
Lithuania in World War II
Legal history of Lithuania
Lithuania, Provisional Government of
1941 in Lithuania
Former republics